Chibirov is a masculine surname, its feminine counterpart is Chibirova. Notable people with the surname include:

 Aleksandr Chibirov (born 1992), Russian football defender
 Lyudvig Chibirov (born 1932), first President of South Ossetia

Russian-language surnames